Antonio Porcino (born 30 May 1995) is an Italian professional footballer who plays as a midfielder.

Career
Porcino has played for Reggina, Santarcangelo, Taranto, Benevento, Ischia, Catania and Livorno.

On 20 January 2021, he signed a 1.5-year contract with Catanzaro.

On 31 January 2022, Porcino moved to Reggiana.

References

1995 births
Living people
Italian footballers
Reggina 1914 players
Santarcangelo Calcio players
Taranto F.C. 1927 players
Benevento Calcio players
S.S. Ischia Isolaverde players
Catania S.S.D. players
U.S. Livorno 1915 players
U.S. Catanzaro 1929 players
A.C. Reggiana 1919 players
Serie B players
Serie C players
Serie D players
Association football midfielders